The Union Européenne de Cyclisme (abbreviation: UEC, English: European Cycling Union) is the European confederation of national cycling bodies; the national federations of the Union Cycliste Internationale form confederations by continent. It is headquartered in Lausanne. In reaction to the 2022 Russian invasion of Ukraine, the UEC announced that Russia and Belarus officials will not be able to officiate at any UEC event, or attend or take part in any UEC meeting, committee, or forum.

European Cycling Championships

The federation organizes all the European Cycling Championships (such as the European Road Championships and the European Track Championships) for all cycling disciplines, including road cycling, track cycling, cyclo-cross, BMX, mountain biking and indoor cycling and awards the UEC European Champion jersey to the European Champions.

In 2018, as part of the multi-sport European Championships, the UEC brought its four main European championships  - track, road, mountain bike and BMX - together for the first time as the 2018 European Cycling Championships.

Summary of events
 UEC European Paracycling Championships 
 UCI Europe Tour
 European Road Championships
 UEC European Track Championships
 UEC European Track Championships (under-23 & junior)
 UEC European Cyclo-cross Championships
 European Mountain Bike Championships
 European BMX Championships
 European Indoor Cycling Championships (Artistic and Cycleball)
 European Junior Indoor Cycling Championships (Artistic and Cycleball)
 European Masters Cycling Championships
 European Para Cycling Cup

Member Federations

References

External links
 UEC official website

Cycle racing organizations
Union Cycliste Internationale
Sports governing bodies in Europe
 
1990 establishments in Switzerland